In number theory, the classical modular curve is an irreducible plane algebraic curve given by an equation

,

such that  is a point on the curve. Here  denotes the -invariant.

The curve is sometimes called , though often that notation is used for the abstract algebraic curve for which there exist various models.

It is important to note that the classical modular curves are part of the larger theory of modular curves.  In particular it has another expression as a compactified quotient of the complex upper half-plane .

Geometry of the modular curve 

The classical modular curve, which we will call , is of degree greater than or equal to  when , with equality if and only if  is a prime. The polynomial  has integer coefficients, and hence is defined over every field. However, the coefficients are sufficiently large that computational work with the curve can be difficult. Since ,  is symmetrical around the line , and has singular points at the repeated roots of the classical modular polynomial, where it crosses itself in the complex plane.

Parametrization of the modular curve 

It is not necessary to actually compute  to use this parametrization; it can be taken as an arbitrary parameter.

Mappings 

Mappings also arise in connection with  since points on it correspond to some -isogenous pairs of elliptic curves. An isogeny between two elliptic curves is a non-trivial morphism of varieties (defined by a rational map) between the curves which also respects the group laws, and hence which sends the point at infinity (serving as the identity of the group law) to the point at infinity. Such a map is always surjective and has a finite kernel, the order of which is the degree of the isogeny. Points on  correspond to pairs of elliptic curves admitting an isogeny of degree  with cyclic kernel.

When  has genus one, it will itself be isomorphic to an elliptic curve, which will have the same -invariant.

For instance,  has -invariant , and is isomorphic to the curve . The two rational roots correspond to isomorphism classes of curves with rational coefficients which are 5-isogenous to the above curve, but not isomorphic, having a different function field.

If in the curve , isomorphic to  we substitute

By a theorem of Henri Carayol, if an elliptic curve  is modular then its conductor, an isogeny invariant described originally in terms of cohomology, is the smallest integer  such that there exists a rational mapping .

Galois theory of the modular curve 
The Galois theory of the modular curve was investigated by Erich Hecke.

This extension contains an algebraic extension  where if  in the notation of Gauss then:

If we extend the field of constants to be , we now have an extension with Galois group , the projective special linear group of the field with  elements, which is a finite simple group.

See also 
Algebraic curves
J-invariant
Modular curve
Modular function

References 
Erich Hecke, Die eindeutige Bestimmung der Modulfunktionen q-ter Stufe durch algebraische Eigenschaften, Math. Ann. 111 (1935), 293-301, reprinted in Mathematische Werke, third edition, Vandenhoeck & Ruprecht, Göttingen, 1983, 568-576 
Anthony Knapp, Elliptic Curves, Princeton, 1992
Serge Lang, Elliptic Functions, Addison-Wesley, 1973
Goro Shimura, Introduction to the Arithmetic Theory of Automorphic Functions, Princeton, 1972

External links 

 Coefficients of 

Algebraic curves
Modular forms
Analytic number theory